Raaj Shaandilyaa is an Indian television and Bollywood writer from Jhansi, Uttar Pradesh. From 2007 to 2014, Shaandilyaa was a lead writer and content director for the Sony Entertainment Television series, Comedy Circus. Shaandilyaa began his career in 2006 and has written approximately 350 scripts for Krishna Abhishek and Sudesh Lehri and approximately 200 scripts for comedian Kapil Sharma.

Shaandilyaa holds a 2013 record in the Limca Book of Records for having written 625 scripts. In 2019, he made his directorial debut with the comedy film Dream Girl, which was a commercial success.

Filmography

References

External links 
 

Indian television writers
Living people
Screenwriters from Mumbai
Indian male screenwriters
Hindi screenwriters
Male television writers
1985 births